Harshaw Chapel and Cemetery is a historic Methodist chapel and cemetery at Church and Central Streets in Murphy, Cherokee County, North Carolina. The chapel was built on land gifted to the church by Joshua Harshaw, who was a prominent slaveholder in the area. The chapel was completed May 1, 1869, and is a vernacular Greek Revival style brick church. The surrounding Murphy Methodist Cemetery contains graves dated as early as about 1840.

It was listed on the National Register of Historic Places in 1984.

See also
National Register of Historic Places listings in Cherokee County, North Carolina

References

Methodist churches in North Carolina
Cemeteries in North Carolina
Churches on the National Register of Historic Places in North Carolina
Chapels in the United States
Churches completed in 1869
19th-century Methodist church buildings in the United States
Churches in Cherokee County, North Carolina
Methodist cemeteries
National Register of Historic Places in Cherokee County, North Carolina
1869 establishments in North Carolina
Historic districts on the National Register of Historic Places in North Carolina